Wafadaar is a 1985 Hindi film directed by Dasari Narayana Rao. The film stars Rajinikanth, Padmini Kolhapuri and Vijeta Pandit for the first time in a love triangle well supported by Kader Khan, Anupam Kher, Shakti Kapoor, Asrani, Paintal and others.

Plot 
Wafadaar (1985) is a Bollywood flick wherein Daya Sagar (Anupam Kher) plots to obtain the wealth of Rajgiri (Kader Khan). Sager asks his servant Ranga (Rajinikanth) to woo Rajgiri's daughter Seeta (Padmini Kolhapure) and marry her. Ranga is unaware that Daya's motive is to kill Seeta to possess her father's fortune. Once Ranga finds out Daya's intent, he revolts and foils Daya's murderous plans. Ranga and Seeta wed and happily live in married bliss. Unlike most of Rajinikanth's action films this film was more of a comedy masala movie particularly by Kader Khan and Anupam Kher. Rajinikanth was paired with Padmini Kolhapure in the film. In the same year she played his sister in the film Bewafai

Cast 
Rajinikanth as Ranga
Padmini Kolhapure as Seeta
Vijeta Pandit as Chanda
Shakti Kapoor as Prasad
Kader Khan as Damdev Mahadev Rajgiri
Anupam Kher as Daya Sagar
Satyen Kappu as  Advocate Mahesh Patel
Ashalata Wabgaonkar as Daya Sagar's Wife
Sushma Seth as Mrs. Damdev Mahadev Rajgiri

Music 
Bappi Lahiri composed 5 songs penned by Indeevar and four of them, "Dim Dim Dim Tana Dim", "Ek Chandan Ki Khushboo", "Sapnon Ka Tu Raja" and "Mere Sajna" became hits.

References

External links 

1985 films
1980s Hindi-language films
Films directed by Dasari Narayana Rao
Films scored by Bappi Lahiri